Alexis Araujo (born 7 November 1996) is a professional footballer who plays as an attacking midfielder for Championnat National 2 club Créteil. Born in France, he is a former France and Portugal youth international.

Club career
Araujo is a youth exponent from Lille. He made his Ligue 1 debut on 21 November 2015 against Troyes replacing Éric Bauthéac after 87 minutes in a 1–1 away draw.

During the second half of the 2015–16 season he was loaned out to Championnat National side Boulogne. He stayed in the Championnat National the following season, moving to Dunkerque on loan.

Araujo was released from his contract by Lille in October 2017, and signed for Gazélec Ajaccio in Ligue 2. After 37 Ligue 2 appearances in a 16 months, he was loaned to Quevilly-Rouen in January 2019, until the end of the 2018–19 season. After a successful loan spell, he joined Quevilly-Rouen on a permanent deal in June 2019.

In August 2020 Araujo followed his Quevilly-Rouen manager to SC Lyon, signing an initial one-year contract with the club.

In July 2021, Araujo moved to Créteil.

International career
Araujo was born in France to parents of Portuguese descent. He debuted for the France U16s, making three appearances for them. Within the year, in 2013, he debuted for the Portugal U17s. He remains eligible for both France and Portugal.

References

External links

 

1996 births
Living people
Sportspeople from Tourcoing
French people of Portuguese descent
Portuguese footballers
French footballers
Portugal youth international footballers
France youth international footballers
Association football midfielders
Lille OSC players
US Boulogne players
USL Dunkerque players
Gazélec Ajaccio players
US Quevilly-Rouen Métropole players
Lyon La Duchère players
US Créteil-Lusitanos players
Ligue 1 players
Ligue 2 players
Championnat National players
Footballers from Hauts-de-France